The Eastern States Archeological Federation is an archaeological society that was founded in 1933. Its member societies represent the Eastern United States and Canada. It has published a Bulletin since 1941 and an annual journal, Archaeology of Eastern North America, since 1973.

The member societies are:
 Archaeological Society of Connecticut
 Archaeological Society of Delaware
 Archaeological Society of New Jersey
 Maryland Archaeological Society
 Maine Archaeological Society
 Massachusetts Archaeological Society
 New Hampshire Archaeological Society
 New York State Archaeological Association
 Ohio Archaeological Council
 Society for Pennsylvania Archaeology
 Vermont Archaeological Society
 Archeological Society of Virginia
 West Virginia Archaeological Society

References

External links
Official website

Archaeological organizations
1933 establishments in the United States